Diane Patrick may refer to:

 Diane Patrick (lawyer), First Lady of Massachusetts
 Diane Patrick (Texas politician) (born 1946), member of the Texas House of Representatives